Yuriy Abovyan (born 1931) was a Soviet swimmer who won a bronze medal in the  freestyle relay at the 1954 European Aquatics Championships. Next year he won a national title in the 400 m freestyle event.

References

1931 births
Soviet male freestyle swimmers
European Aquatics Championships medalists in swimming
Sportspeople from Tbilisi
Male swimmers from Georgia (country)
Georgian people of Armenian descent
Year of death missing